Mr. Black: Green Star is a 2015 Chinese animated science fiction action comedy film directed by Shengjun Yu, Xuegang Shi, Song Qing and Yi Shi. It is based on the Chinese Black Cat Detective animated series, and was released on August 7, 2015.

Plot
The movie begins with a shot of the prison in which One-ear mouse is being locked up. However, a meteor storm damages the prison, allowing One-ear mouse to get away. He is chased down by officers and cornered off but falls into a crater made by one of the meteors. Suddenly, a giant ape comes out of the crater and starts beating up the police officers. Just then, the duck dude comes and brings with him a whole squad of cat officers who then begin singing in order to introduce the main character: Inspector Black. Inspector Black Cat tries to get the ape to surrender but he gets away.

Voice cast
Lu Zhao as  Black Cat Detective
Tian Hao Wu as One-Ear Mouse
Zijie Lin as Mu Sandu
Ying Liu as Theta / Mom
Yuzhu Cheng as Dr. Great Ape
Chuanying Li as Duck Officer
Jia Zhan
Dian Tao
Jiajia Shi
Shengjun Yu

Reception
The film earned  at the Chinese box office.

References

External links

2015 action comedy films
2010s science fiction comedy films
2015 anime films
2015 films
Animated action films
Animated comedy films
Chinese animated films
Chinese animated science fiction films
Animated films based on animated series
Chinese teen films
2015 science fiction action films